She Knew All the Answers is a 1941 romantic comedy film made by Columbia Pictures, directed by Richard Wallace, and starring by Joan Bennett and Franchot Tone. The film tells a story about a chorus girl who wants to marry a rich playboy, but first has to prove herself to his financial advisor. The screenplay was written by Kenneth Earl, Curtis Kenyon, and Harry Segall, adapted from a short story written by Jane Allen entitled "A Girl's Best Friend Is Wall Street," published in 1938 in Cosmopolitan Magazine.

Plot 

A chorus girl, Gloria Winters (Joan Bennett), is overjoyed that wealthy young Randy Bradford (John Hubbard) is so eager to marry her, he's asked her to elope. Before they can leave, Randy is contacted by Mark Willows (Franchot Tone), a partner with the Wall Street financial organization that Randy's father founded, as well as Randy's financial advisor. Willows stipulates that Randy will be disinherited should he elope with this girl.

Gloria is naturally upset. She comes up with a plan to gain Willows approval through work and receive a letter of recommendation, which can then be used as their marriage license. When she goes to see Willows, she expects an older man and is thrown off-balance by his youth and charm. Without revealing her true identity, Gloria lands a job at Willows' firm as a switchboard operator. A slip of the tongue on her part, however, costs Willows a great deal of money and she is fired.

Willows calms down and tries to make it up to her, visiting the apartment Gloria shares with Sally Long, another chorus girl. While there, Willows offers Gloria her job back, in which she accepts. Gloria and Willow continue to advance both their professional and personal relationships, both in and out of the office. Randy starts to see the chemistry forming between the two and gets jealous. He goes to Willows and demands a job as well. Willows learns Gloria's true identity and agrees to allow Randy and Gloria to get married, in an attempt to mask his feelings for Gloria.

While walking down the aisle at the wedding, a ghost like figure of each character acts as a personification of their inner thoughts and the viewer learns that Randy no longer wants to get married and Gloria and Willows have both fallen for each other. Randy pretends to faint in hopes of ending the wedding, and Gloria and Willows take this opportunity to run away together.

Cast 
 Joan Bennett as  Gloria Winters
 Franchot Tone as  Mark Willows
 John Hubbard as  Randy Bradford
 Eve Arden as  Sally Long
 William Tracy as  Benny
 Pierre Watkin as  George Wharton
 Almira Sessions as  Elaine Wingate
 Thurston Hall as  J.D. Sutton
 Grady Sutton as  Ogleby
 Luis Alberni as  Inventor
 Francis Compton as  Tompkins
 Dick Elliott as  Broker
 Selmer Jackson as  Broker
 Forbes Murray as  Broker
 Roscoe Ates as  Gas Station Attendant
 Chester Clute as  Butter and Egg Man
 George Lloyd as  Cop
 Frank Sully as  Cop
 Eddie Conrad as  Waiter
 Patti McCarty as  Hat Check Girl
 William 'Billy' Benedict as  Singing Telegraph Boy
 Fern Emmett as  Woman Applicant
 Walter Soderling as Building Utility Man
 Don Beddoe as  Barber
 Patricia Hill as  Manicurist
 Onest Conley as  Shoeshine Boy
 George Hickman as  Elevator Operator
 Don Marion as  Elevator Operator
 Alice Keating as  Telephone Operator
 Dave Willock as  Messenger Boy
 Thom Metzetti as  Milkman
 George Beranger as  Head Waiter
 Charles Lane as Coney Island Bus Driver (uncredited)

Adaptions 
She Knew All The Answers was adapted from a short story by Jane Allen entitled "A Girls Best Friend Is Wall Street". This story was printed in Cosmopolitan Magazine in December, 1938. On January 11, 1943, Lux Radio Theater ran a 56-minute adaption of the movie, starring Joan Bennett and Preston Foster.

References 

 
 She Knew All the Answers at Allmovie

External links 
 

1941 films
American black-and-white films
Columbia Pictures films
1941 romantic comedy films
Films directed by Richard Wallace
American romantic comedy films
1940s American films